Suhasini Rajaram Naidu (born 12 October 1981), known by her stage name Sneha, is an Indian actress who works primarily in Tamil and Telugu films. She made her debut with Malayalam movie Ingane Oru Nilapakshi. She debuted in Telugu in the year 2001 with the film Priyamaina Neeku.

She has won  Tamil state film Awards and some regional awards for her acting in some of her films.

Early and personal life 
Sneha was born as Suhasini Rajaram Naidu on 12 October 1981 in a Telugu family in Mumbai, Maharashtra and was brought up in Dubai.

Sneha was paired with Prasanna for the first time in Achchamundu! Achchamundu! (2009). Since then, there were numerous reports in the media on their relationship. Prasanna was spotted in all her modeling shows and both were spotted together in movie previews. Though both denied it as a rumour, later, on 9 November 2011, Prasanna announced, "Yes... Sneha and I decided to marry soon with the blessings of our parents." They married on 11 May 2012 in Chennai.

She resides in Chennai with her husband. The couple has two children, a boy and a girl.

Career

2000–2004 
Fazil Nazeem recommended Sneha to Anil-Babu who was searching for a heroine for his love story Ingane Oru Nilapakshi (2000). The film featured Sneha as an aspiring dancer, with the actress performing for seven classical songs. She was signed by Susi Ganeshan for his directorial debut Virumbugiren in 2000, which however became long delayed and Ennavale, opposite Madhavan, became her first Tamil release. She won many accolades for her outstanding performance. Later that year, Sneha starred in N. Linguswamy's family drama Aanandham and won many awards, which featured her as part of an ensemble cast and in K. Balachandar's Parthale Paravasam. She finished the year with a foray into Telugu cinema, with an appearance in Priyamaina Neeku, followed by Tholi Valapu.

She was a part of eight films that were released in 2002. M. Raja's Hanuman Junction became a major success. Other films that year included the Vasanth's Yai! Nee Romba Azhaga Irukey!, Unnai Ninaithu and April Madhathil. Even though Yai! Nee Romba Azhaga Irukey! had one of her prolific performance, the film failed at the box office while critics and audience raved at the music of the film. Her performance in Unnai Ninaithu led to her being awarded the first Filmfare Award for Best Supporting Actress. She also won other awards for her performance. Subsequently, she acted in a lead role in King and a supporting role in Pammal K. Sambandam with Kamal Haasan and Abbas, respectively. Virumbugiren that featured Sneha as a rustic village belle, eventually released in December 2002 and went on to win the Tamil Nadu State Film Award for Best Actress.

Sneha acted in two films in 2003, Vaseegara with Vijay and a heroine-oriented double role in Parthiban Kanavu. both were huge successes. She received high praise for her performance in Parthiban Kanavu, with The Hindu writing: "Till date this is the best role that has come Sneha's way and the charming actress has utilised the opportunity well. With make-up or without it, Sneha sparkles".

2004 was a mixed year for the actress, with Jana, Bose and Adhu all failing at the box office. However, Vasool Raja MBBS, opposite Kamal Haasan and Autograph were successes and won several awards.

2005–2008 
The years 2005 and 2006 saw her acting in Telugu films such as Sankranthi, with Venkatesh, Radha Gopalam with Srikanth, Sri Ramadasu with Nagarjuna, and Thuruppu Gulan with Mammootty was a success, while others released in the respective years turning out as average grosser at the box office. She played the role of a commercial sex worker in Selvaraghavan's Pudhupettai, starring Dhanush. With Thuruppu Gulan, she paired with Mammootty. In the year 2006, she made her debut into Kannada film industry through Ravi Shastri, which was unsuccessful at the box office.

In 2007, Sneha starred in Naan Avanillai a hit, while her Telugu films Madhumasam, which run over 100 days and Maharadhi and Tamil film Pallikoodam was successful at the box office.

Pirivom Santhippom, which saw her collaborating with Karu Pazhaniappan again, was her first film in 2008. Co-starring Cheran, the film opened to critical acclaim and emerged a sleeper hit, while fetching Sneha plaudits and several accolades. A review from Sify noted that she was "superb as Sala, a woman torn by the dualities of her existence", labelling it as her "career best performance". She won her second Tamil Nadu State Film Award for Best Actress, besides the Vijay Award for Best Actress and a nomination for the Filmfare Award for Best Actress Award. She tried highly glamorous roles with Pandi and Inba, both turning out to be average grossers. She paired with Silambarasan in Silambattam, which gave her another commercial success. Her Telugu films Nee Sukhame Ne Korukunna and Pandurangadu turned out to be average grossers while Adi Vishnu was unsuccessful.

2009–2012 
The thriller films Achchamundu Achchamundu, co-starring Prasanna and Hollywood actor John Shea and Amaravathi, were her only releases of 2009 in Tamil and Telugu, respectively. Both films won many plaudits for dealing with bold themes of pedophiles and womb stealing, respectively. The former film won many awards in the International Panorama and the latter had an average gross at the box office.

In 2010, she starred in Venkat Prabhu's Goa. She again forayed into a glamorous ultra-modern chick role with a few shades of grey. She also appeared in three Malayalam films. She acted in Pramani with Mammootty and paired up with Mohanlal for the first time in Shikkar, The Hunt, which was a huge success and considered as a milestone in Mohanlal's history. Her last release of 2011 was Vande Mataram. Starring opposite Mammootty again, she played an aviator in the film, which released to mixed critical response and was unsuccessful.

In 2011, she was first seen as a tough police officer in Bhavani, which opened to mixed reviews and bombed at the box office, although Sneha received praise for her performance. Ponnar Shankar, a period film penned by M. Karunanidhi, where she appeared as a warrior-princess, opened to mixed reviews and didn't do well at the box office. Rajanna, a period film based on Telangana issue opposite Nagarjuna for the second time, released on 22 December 2012 to stupendous reviews.

In 2012, her long canned movie, Murattu Kaalai, with Sundar C was released on 15 June 2012 to mixed reviews, being her first movie post-marriage.

2013–present
In 2013, she acted in a critically acclaimed movie Haridas. The movie opened to critical acclaim and performed well at the box office. Sneha was nominated for Filmfare Best Actress Award for her performance in the movie.

Her next release was a trilingual made in Kannada, Tamil and Telugu – Un Samayal Arayil (2014), the official remake of the Malayalam blockbuster Salt N' Pepper, where she starred opposite Prakash Raj and a bunch of debutantes. The Kannada version was successful, while the other two versions was unsuccessful. Sneha later hosted a Tamil reality television show Melam Kottu Thali Kattu and the show was aired for 2 seasons.

In 2015, Sneha appeared in the Telugu film S/O Satyamurthy with Allu Arjun, Samantha Ruth Prabhu and Nithya Menen, opposite Upendra, directed by Trivikram Srinivas, which turned out to be a blockbuster. That was her only release in 2015 and she has been on a maternity break since then.

In 2017, Sneha starred in The Great Father opposite Mammootty, and produced by actors Prithviraj Sukumaran and Arya. She starred in Velaikkaran directed by Mohan Raja, alongside Sivakarthikeyan and Nayanthara.  She was also the judge a Tamil reality TV show, Dance Jodi Dance, alongside Raadhika. In 2019, she starred in the Telugu-language film Vinaya Vidheya Rama and the historical Kannada-language film Kurukshetra. She played the lead actress in Pattas (2020) with Dhanush. Her upcoming films including Mani Ratnam's anthology film Navarasa and Vaan.

Other assignments 

Sneha was to make her Bollywood debut with Mad Dad, alongside Naseeruddin Shah and Ayesha Takia, to be directed by Revathy S. Varma. Sneha was also roped in to play Sita in Rajkumar Santoshi's Ramayan, featuring Ajay Devgan in lead. However, both the projects failed to take off. She was also reported to play a major role in Kochadaiyaan, to be written by K. S. Ravikumar and directed by Soundarya Rajinikanth. In December 2011, Sneha confirmed in an interview that she will be starring opposite Rajinikanth. But later, she opted out of the project to allocate dates for the film Haridas, to which she is already committed.

Modeling 
She has appeared in many commercials such as Saravana Stores, Horlicks, Roobini Oil, Aashirvaad, Idhayam Dots, Jos Aalukkas, Power Shampoos, Shree Devi Textiles, Preethi Mixi, GRB Udhayam Ghee, Papilon, Vencobb Chicken, Nisha Fairness Cream, Kellogg's Chocos, Tata Salt etc. In 2010, she was announced the brand ambassador for Dabur Amla Nelli Hair Oil and Cavin Kare's Chinni's Pickle. Post-marriage, Sneha along with her husband Prasanna worked on  Univercell commercials which created viral response.

She also appeared in numerous fashion shows such as Chennai International Fashion Week, Sydney Sladen Fashion Week and other shows which were held in Chennai and Mumbai.

Filmography

Film

Notes

References

External links 

 

Telugu actresses
Indian film actresses
Actresses in Tamil cinema
Living people
Actresses in Telugu cinema
Tamil Nadu State Film Awards winners
Filmfare Awards South winners
Actresses in Malayalam cinema
Recipients of the Kalaimamani Award
Actresses from Mumbai
21st-century Indian actresses
1981 births